The members of the 40th General Assembly of Newfoundland were elected in the Newfoundland general election held in April 1985. The general assembly sat from April 25, 1985 to March 29, 1989.

The Progressive Conservative Party led by Brian Peckford formed the government. Tom Rideout succeeded Peckford as party leader and Premier in March 1989.

Patrick McNicholas served as speaker.

There were four sessions of the 40th General Assembly:

William Anthony Paddon served as lieutenant governor of Newfoundland until 1986. James McGrath succeeded Paddon as lieutenant governor.

Members of the Assembly 
The following members were elected to the assembly in 1985:

Notes:

By-elections 
By-elections were held to replace members for various reasons:

Notes:

References 

Terms of the General Assembly of Newfoundland and Labrador